Mike Hill may refer to:

 Mike Hill (golfer) (born 1939), American
 Mike Hill (bishop) (born 1949), English
 Mike Hill (film editor) (born 1952), American
 Mike Hill (American politician) (born 1958)
 Mike Hill (British politician) (born 1963)
 Mike Hill (sportscaster) (born 1972), American
 Mike Hill (athletic director), American
 Mike Hill (mathematician), American

See also 
 Michael Hill (disambiguation)
 Mick Hill (disambiguation)